Rhipidarctia pareclecta is a moth in the family Erebidae. It was described by William Jacob Holland in 1893. It is found in Angola, Gabon, Kenya and Uganda.

References

Moths described in 1893
Syntomini